Area code 679 is an inactive telephone  area code in the North American Numbering Plan (NANP).

In February 2000, the area code was assigned as a second area code to form an overlay plan with area code 313 in the county of Wayne in the southeastern part of the U.S. state of Michigan. However, the relief schedule was cancelled in April 2000, and the implementation of the overlay was suspended.

Recent proposal
In early 2023, the idea of creating a new area code 679 was rejuvenated in the same geographic area of Michigan.  Area code 313, which serves the city of Detroit and several of its closest suburbs, may begin running out of available phone numbers by 2025.  According to the Michigan Public Service Commission, the proposed use of area code 679 would overlay with the same geographic area of 313.  Current residents would continue using 313, while new numbers assigned to the area would be given 679.  This proposed overlay plan would be similar to the area codes 248 and 947 just to the north in Oakland County.  Opponents cite the cultural importance and impact of area code 313, in which "313" is often synonymous with the city of Detroit.

References

679
679